Omidabad (also Romanized as Omīdābād; also known as Omīdābād-e Yesirgechan) is a village in Soltanali Rural District, in the Central District of Gonbad-e Qabus County, Golestan Province, Iran. At the 2006 census, its population was 740, in 148 families.

References 

Populated places in Gonbad-e Kavus County